Newquay Central is an electoral division of Cornwall in the United Kingdom and returns one member to sit on Cornwall Council. The current Councillor is Geoff Brown, a Liberal Democrat and the Portfolio Holder for Transport on the council.

Extent
Newquay Central covers the centre of the town of Newquay, including Towan Head and Fistral Beach. The division covers 154 hectares in total.

Election results

2017 election

2013 election

2009 election

References

Newquay
Electoral divisions of Cornwall Council